Boherbue Comprehensive School is a secondary school in Boherbue, County Cork, Ireland.

History
This school was opened in 1973 as a co-educational, non-selective post-primary school. The term 'comprehensive' was current at that time and the curriculum of the school combined what were formally regarded as the 'secondary' subjects with the 'technical' subjects. This was seen as giving a broad range of subjects under which pupils with very varying degrees of aptitude, ability and skills could prosper.

Sport
Gaelic football is the most popular sport within the school and it competes in the All-Ireland Vocational Schools Championship. In 1992 the school were runners-up in the All-Ireland Senior Vocational School Championship and in 1998 it won the All-Ireland Junior Vocational School Championship. In 2001, the school won the All Ireland Ladies Senior Football Vocational Championship. Sports such as basketball and hurling are also played at the school.

Past pupils
 Tony Buckley, former Munster Rugby, Sale Sharks and Irish Rugby International
 Michael Moynihan, Fianna Fáil politician and TD for Cork North-West
 Donncha O'Connor, Cork senior inter-county GAA player

External links
Homepage of Boherbue Comprehensive School

Educational institutions established in 1973
Secondary schools in County Cork
1973 establishments in Ireland